Abdul Latif Helou  is a Syrian football midfielder who played for Syria in the 1996 Asian Cup.

Honours
Individual
 Lebanese Premier League top scorer: 1997–98

References

External links

11v11.com

Syrian footballers
Living people
1971 births
Place of birth missing (living people)
Syria international footballers
Association football midfielders
1996 AFC Asian Cup players